State Route 278 (SR 278) is a state highway in Nevada. It runs from U.S. Route 50 (US 50) near Eureka north to Interstate 80 (I-80) in Carlin.

Route description

The highway heads north-northwest from there, passing by the Eureka Airport and going through Diamond Valley.

SR 278 continues heading northward, eventually entering Pine Valley. After several miles, the highway shifts slightly more eastward as it approaches the Cortez Mountains and the Pinon Range. The route follows a creek northwestward, then curves to follow the path of the Humboldt River and Union Pacific Railroad 
northeastward. The route enters Elko County and soon after enters the city of Carlin. State Route 278 ends on the western edge of Carlin at West Carlin interchange on I-80 (exit 279).

History

A route approximating the alignment of Eureka–Carlin Road appeared on state highway maps as a narrow, unimproved roadway as early as 1927. By 1929, this road had been designated as State Route 20, and was shown to parallel the Eureka and Palisade Railroad connecting Eureka to State Route 1/US 40 (today's I-80) further west of Carlin via Palisade. SR 20 was mostly upgraded to a gravel road by 1946. Except for the portion between Palisade and US 40, the road was completely paved by 1956—a road connecting just south of Palisade directly to Carlin (approximating today's alignment of the northernmost reaches of SR 278) was also paved by this time. The Eureka–Carlin road portion of SR 20 was renumbered as part of State Route 51 by 1965.

The Eureka–Carlin road remained unchanged for several years after being renumbered to SR 51. However, the Nevada Department of Transportation began renumbering its state highways in the mid 1970s. On July 1, 1976, the road was renumbered again, to State Route 278, the designation it carries today. The number change was first seen on official state highway maps in 1978. The route has remain substantially unchanged since then.

Major intersections
Note: Mileposts in Nevada reset at county lines; the start and end mileposts for each county are given in the county column

See also

 List of state highways in Nevada

References

External links

278
Transportation in Elko County, Nevada
SR 278